Lytton is an electoral district of the Legislative Assembly in the Australian state of Queensland.

The district is based in the eastern suburbs of Brisbane, to the south of the Brisbane River. It is named for the suburb of Lytton and also includes the suburbs of Hemmant, Lota, Manly and Wynnum, as well as the Port of Brisbane. The electorate was first created for the 1972 election.

Lytton is normally a safe Labor Party seat, although it was won in 2012 by the Liberal National Party.

Members for Lytton

Election results

References

External links
 

Lytton